The women's 10,000 metres event at the 2001 Summer Universiade was held in Beijing, China on 29 August.

Results

References

Athletics at the 2001 Summer Universiade
2001 in women's athletics
2001